Anubha Gupta (1929 - 14 January 1972) was an Indian Bengali actress and singer who is known for her work in Bengali cinema. She received the Best Actress in Supporting Role Award at the 26th Annual BFJA Awards for the film Hansuli Banker Upakatha.

Early life
Anubha Gupta was born in 1930 in Dinajpur, British India. She had an interest in dance and music since her childhood. She studied in Parry Charan Girls School and Shantiniketan.

Career
Gupta joined Bengali cinema as a playback singer when music director Robin Chatterjee introduced her to films. Her debut film as an actress was Samarpan which was released in 1949. She acted in theater in parallel with the silver screen. Her performance in Kabi, Ratna Dip, Champadangar Bou, Hansuli Banker Upokatha made her an established film actress and she rapidly worked her way to the top among Bengali actresses within five years. She also worked with Satyajit Ray in Abhijan and Kanchanjangha. Gupta first married footballer Anil De. Her second marriage was with actor Rabi Ghosh.

Filmography

References

External links
 

Indian film actresses
Actresses in Bengali cinema
1930 births
1972 deaths
20th-century Indian actresses
Bengali Hindus
People from Dinajpur District, Bangladesh